

The Bede BD-17 Nugget is an American single-seat monoplane. designed by Bedecorp for amateur construction from a kit.

Design and development
The Nugget was announced in June 2000 and was designed to be easy to build with a maximum of 100 parts. The first flight of the tricycle landing gear prototype was on 11 February 2001. It is an all-metal low-wing monoplane, it has optional folding wings and is available with fixed conventional landing gear with a tailwheel or a tricycle landing gear. It can be fitted with an engine between 45 and 80 hp (33.6 to 59.7 kW). The prototype had a  HKS 700E two-cylinder four-stroke engine. The pilot has an enclosed cockpit with a rearward-sliding canopy.

Specifications

References

Notes

Bibliography

2000s United States civil utility aircraft
Homebuilt aircraft
Single-engined tractor aircraft
BD-12
Low-wing aircraft
Aircraft first flown in 2001